The mantled mastiff bat (Otomops secundus) is a species of bat in the Molossidae family endemic to Papua New Guinea.

References

Otomops
Bats of Oceania
Endemic fauna of Papua New Guinea
Mammals of Papua New Guinea
Taxonomy articles created by Polbot
Mammals described in 1952
Bats of New Guinea